National Intelligence Service (Kenya) (NIS) which was previously known as the National Security Intelligence Service (NSIS) is both the (national) domestic and foreign intelligence agency of Kenya.  It had its origins in "Special Branch" a department of the national police that was created in 1952 under the British administration. Among other things it provided intelligence during the Mau Mau uprising.

History

19th-century Kenyan intelligence
The Nandi, on hearing of the British, sought to attack them. On the other hand, the Kamba people responded differently to the British as they had traversed the central and coastal areas as long-distance traders during which they gathered information for their leaders.

British colonists recruited mercenaries as porters and guides. First the mercenaries provided information, but later they served as community chiefs, displacing traditional leaders. This meant that most of those who became chiefs were opportunists.

Later the government of the Kenya Protectorate began intelligence gathering which is shown in the timeline below.

Timeline/progress
The colonial system did not destroy existing networks, but used them to build a new intelligence system. The colonial government initially gathered information from tourists, missionaries and traders, but after 1895 gathered information at the local level through commissioners and retainers, including from African allies and collaborators. From 1906, intelligence reports were submitted to the Commissioner of the East Africa Protectorate.
The British East African Police was established in 1892, and for 18 years gathered intelligence. During World War One, the focus of intelligence gathering changed from African affairs to information on enemy activities in neighbouring countries. African agents were recruited, and tapped telegraphic communications, tracked the enemy, and visited other African workers to gather information. Coastal traders engaged in counter-intelligence.

Special Branch (SB)
In 1926 a Criminal Investigations Division was created, staffed by colonists, and involving a Special Branch responsible for intelligence.
In the post-World War Two period until 1963, the SB's activities expanded from the collection of intelligence on criminal activities to investigation of citizens agitating for independence and the trade union movement. The SB also expanded to combat the Mau Mau insurgency and was reorganised following intelligence failures.
The post-independence government inherited an intelligence mentality that used force to ensure compliance. After 1965, police and intelligence services became politicised and linked to individuals. By 1982, the police force (including the SB) had become a tool of oppression, systematically abusing the law and disregarding the Constitution.
In 1998, however, the National Security Intelligence Service was created, and over 170 SB officers were purged from the NSIS. In 1999, the NSIS and the police were separated, arrest authority was removed from the NSIS, and a tribunal was established for complaints against the intelligence service.

Kenyan independence/Directorate of Security Intelligence (DSI)
In 1963 with independence approaching Special Branch was made independent from the police and in 1969 it was given a new charter. It wasn't until 1986 that it was transformed into the Directorate of Security Intelligence (DSI).

National Security Intelligence Service
In 1998, a new act of Parliament in Kenya established the National Security Intelligence Service (NSIS) to replace the former Directorate of Security Intelligence which at the time was still colloquially known as "Special Branch". The first director general (DG) of the new service was retired Brigadier Wilson A.C. Boinett who served until 2006, when he was replaced with Major-General Michael Gichangi. In January 2011 Gichangi was appointed to a second five-year term. However, Gichangi did not complete his term and resigned his position in August 2014 citing personal reasons. His replacement, Major-General Philip Kameru then serving as the head of military intelligence, was appointed in September after vetting by the National Assembly.

NSIS's intelligence gathering work includes: internal, external and strategic intelligence. The NSIS is charged with identifying conditions that threaten Kenya's political, economic and social stability. It develops techniques and strategies to neutralise such threats. The NSIS director is the national security advisor to the president of Kenya.

The NSIS was relocated from the notorious offices of Special Branch at Nyati House to new headquarters on the outskirts of the city, near the Windsor Golf and Country Hotel. In April 1999, the Moi government appointed Mrs Pamela Mboya, the former Permanent representative to the Habitat, to head a Committee that was charged with formulating a scheme of service for NSIS officers.

Security of tenure given to the Director General of NSIS is designed to protect him from such abuse by members of the governing elite. He has the opportunity to say 'no' to any unlawful or sectarian instructions from his bosses without fear of losing his job.

National Intelligence Service
The NSIS was briefly renamed National Security Intelligence Service (NSIS) and then to National Intelligence Service (NIS) its current name.

Mission
The National Intelligence Service in Kenya is concerned with:
Detecting and Identifying any potential threat to Kenya
Advising the President and Govt of any security threat to Kenya
Taking steps to protect the security interests of Kenya whether political, military or economic.
Vetting people that may hold positions that require security clearance.

Divisions
NIS is divided into seven sections:
1. Administration under the director of administration,
2. Information technology under the director of information technology
3. Internal intelligence under the director of internal intelligence
4. External intelligence under the director of external intelligence
5. Analysis & production under the director of economic affairs
6. Operations under the director of operations
7. National Intelligence Academy under its own director

See also
 Criminal Investigation Department

References

Government agencies established in 1998
Law enforcement in Kenya
Government agencies of Kenya